Compass Cargo Airlines is a Bulgarian cargo airline. Founded in 2021, the company operates three Boeing 737-800/BCF.

Fleet

The Compass Cargo Airlines fleet includes the following aircraft:

References

Airlines of Bulgaria
Airlines established in 2021
Cargo airlines